American Way was a free, inflight magazine available across the entire American Airlines fleet and Admirals Clubs premium lounges. The magazine was first published in 1966. It was published on a monthly basis and reached over 16 million passengers every month.

In 2014, American Airlines appointed Ink as the new publisher of American Way. Ink's first issue launched in January 2015 with a double cover edition featuring rock star David Grohl and the band Foo Fighters, touting a fresh design and an editorial mix of international celebrities, world-class destinations and extraordinary stories. In June 2021, American Way ceased publication.

See also
Celebrated Living

References

External links
American Way website
Ink Global website

Defunct magazines published in the United States
Inflight magazines
Lifestyle magazines published in the United States
Magazines established in 1966
Magazines disestablished in 2021
Magazines published in Texas
Mass media in Dallas